Lucilia is a genus of blow flies in the family Calliphoridae. Various species in this genus are commonly known as green bottle flies.

Species
Genus: Lucilia Robineau-Desvoidy, 1830

Lucilia adisoemartoi Kurahashi, 1988
Lucilia aestuans Robineau-Desvoidy, 1863
Lucilia affinis Robineau-Desvoidy, 1863
Lucilia agilis Robineau-Desvoidy, 1863
Lucilia albofasciata Macquart & Berthelot, 1839
Lucilia ampullacea Villeneuve, 1922
Lucilia andrewsi Senior-White, 1940
Lucilia angustifrons Ye, 1983
Lucilia angustifrontata Ye, 1992
Lucilia appendicifera Fan, 1965
Lucilia arrogans Robineau-Desvoidy, 1863
Lucilia arvensis Robineau-Desvoidy, 1863
Lucilia aurata Robineau-Desvoidy, 1863
Lucilia aureovultu Theowald, 1957
Lucilia azurea Meigen, 1838
Lucilia bazini Séguy, 1934
Lucilia bismarckensis Kurahashi, 1987
Lucilia bufonivora Moniez, 1876
Lucilia caerulea Robineau-Desvoidy, 1863
Lucilia caesar (Linnaeus, 1758)
Lucilia caesia Robineau-Desvoidy, 1863
Lucilia calviceps Bezzi, 1927
Lucilia carbunculus Robineau-Desvoidy, 1863
Lucilia chini Fan, 1965
Lucilia chrysella Robineau-Desvoidy, 1863
Lucilia chrysigastris Robineau-Desvoidy, 1863
Lucilia chrysis Robineau-Desvoidy, 1863
Lucilia cluvia Walker, 1849
Lucilia coelestis Robineau-Desvoidy, 1863
Lucilia coeruleifrons Macquart, 1851
Lucilia coeruleiviridis Macquart, 1855
Lucilia coeruliviridis Macquart, 1855
Lucilia cuprea Robineau-Desvoidy, 1830
Lucilia cuprina Wiedemann, 1830
Lucilia cyanea Robineau-Desvoidy, 1863
Lucilia cylindrica Robineau-Desvoidy, 1863
Lucilia delicatula Robineau-Desvoidy, 1830
Lucilia diffusa Robineau-Desvoidy, 1863
Lucilia discolor Robineau-Desvoidy, 1863
Lucilia dives Robineau-Desvoidy, 1863
Lucilia elongata Shannon, 1924
Lucilia eximia Wiedemann, 1819
Lucilia facialis Robineau-Desvoidy, 1863
Lucilia fastuosa Robineau-Desvoidy, 1863
Lucilia fausta Robineau-Desvoidy, 1863
Lucilia fernandica Macquart, 1855
Lucilia fervida Robineau-Desvoidy, 1830
Lucilia flamma Robineau-Desvoidy, 1863
Lucilia flavidipennis Macquart, 1843
Lucilia floralis Robineau-Desvoidy, 1863
Lucilia fulgida Zetterstedt, 1845
Lucilia fulvicornis Robineau-Desvoidy, 1863
Lucilia fulvipes Loew, 1858
Lucilia fulvocothurnata Brauer, 1899
Lucilia fumicosta Malloch, 1926
Lucilia fuscanipennis Macquart, 1851
Lucilia fuscipalpis Zetterstedt, 1845
Lucilia gemma Robineau-Desvoidy, 1863
Lucilia gemula Robineau-Desvoidy, 1863
Lucilia germana Robineau-Desvoidy, 1830
Lucilia graphita Shannon, 1926
Lucilia gressitti James, 1971
Lucilia hainanensis Fan, 1965
Lucilia hirsutula Grunin, 1969
Lucilia hominivorax Coquerel, 1858
Lucilia hyacinthina Robineau-Desvoidy, 1830
Lucilia illustris (Meigen, 1826)
Lucilia incisuralis Macquart, 1843
Lucilia inclyta Robineau-Desvoidy, 1863
Lucilia indica Robineau-Desvoidy, 1830
Lucilia ingenua Robineau-Desvoidy, 1863
Lucilia insignis Robineau-Desvoidy, 1863
Lucilia inventrix Walker, 1861
Lucilia inventrix Walker, 1861
Lucilia laetatoria Robineau-Desvoidy, 1863
Lucilia laevis Robineau-Desvoidy, 1863
Lucilia lepida Robineau-Desvoidy, 1863
Lucilia libera Robineau-Desvoidy, 1863
Lucilia ligurriens Wied.
Lucilia limbata Robineau-Desvoidy, 1863
Lucilia limpidpennis Robineau-Desvoidy, 1830
Lucilia littoralis Blanchard, 1937
Lucilia luteicornis Jaennicke, 1867
Lucilia magnicornis (Siebke, 1863)
Lucilia magnifica Robineau-Desvoidy, 1863
Lucilia maialis Robineau-Desvoidy, 1863
Lucilia marginalis Robineau-Desvoidy, 1863
Lucilia marginata Macquart, 1843
Lucilia meigenii Schiner, 1862
Lucilia mexicana Macquart, 1843
Lucilia mirifica Robineau-Desvoidy, 1863
Lucilia modesta Robineau-Desvoidy, 1830
Lucilia modica Robineau-Desvoidy, 1863
Lucilia nigriceps Macquart, 1843
Lucilia nigrifrons Robineau-Desvoidy, 1863
Lucilia nigrocoerulea Macquart, 1843
Lucilia nitidula Robineau-Desvoidy, 1863
Lucilia nuptialis Robineau-Desvoidy, 1863
Lucilia obscurella Robineau-Desvoidy, 1863
Lucilia ovatrix Robineau-Desvoidy, 1863
Lucilia pallescens Shannon, 1924
Lucilia pallipes Robineau-Desvoidy, 1830
Lucilia papuensis Macquart, 1843
Lucilia parphyrina Walker.
Lucilia peronii Robineau-Desvoidy, 1830
Lucilia peruviana Robineau-Desvoidy, 1830
Lucilia pilosiventris Kramer, 1910
Lucilia pinguis Walker, 1858
Lucilia porphyrina Walker, 1856
Lucilia prasina Robineau-Desvoidy, 1863
Lucilia pratensis Robineau-Desvoidy, 1863
Lucilia pretiosa Robineau-Desvoidy, 1863
Lucilia princeps Rondani, 1848
Lucilia problematica Johnson, 1913
Lucilia pubescens Robineau-Desvoidy, 1830
Lucilia purpurea Robineau-Desvoidy, 1863
Lucilia purpurescens Walker, 1836
Lucilia pyropus Robineau-Desvoidy, 1863
Lucilia rectinevris Macquart, 1855
Lucilia regalis Meigen, 1826
Lucilia rhodocera 
Lucilia richardsi Collin, 1926
Lucilia rostrellum Robineau-Desvoidy, 1830
Lucilia rufifacies Macquart, 1843
Lucilia salazarae Kurahashi, 1979
Lucilia sapphirea Robineau-Desvoidy, 1830
Lucilia scintilla Robineau-Desvoidy, 1863
Lucilia scutellaris Robineau-Desvoidy, 1863
Lucilia sericata Meigen, 1826
Lucilia shansiensis Fan, 1965
Lucilia shenyangensis Fan, 1965
Lucilia silvarum Meigen, 1826
Lucilia sinensis Aubertin, 1933
Lucilia snyderi James, 1962
Lucilia socialis Robineau-Desvoidy, 1863
Lucilia solers Robineau-Desvoidy, 1863
Lucilia soror Robineau-Desvoidy, 1830
Lucilia spectabilis Robineau-Desvoidy, 1863
Lucilia spekei Jaennicke, 1867
Lucilia spinicosta Hough, 1898
Lucilia sumptuosa Robineau-Desvoidy, 1863
Lucilia taiwanica Kurahashi & Kano, 1995
Lucilia taiyanensis Chu You-Shen, 1975
Lucilia terraenovae Macquart, 1851
Lucilia thatuna Shannon, 1926
Lucilia timorensis Robineau-Desvoidy, 1830
Lucilia tomentosa Robineau-Desvoidy, 1863
Lucilia urens Robineau-Desvoidy, 1863
Lucilia valida Robineau-Desvoidy, 1863
Lucilia varipalpis Macquart, 1843
Lucilia varipes Macquart, 1851
Lucilia vernalis Robineau-Desvoidy, 1863
Lucilia viatrix Robineau-Desvoidy, 1863
Lucilia vicina Robineau-Desvoidy, 1830
Lucilia violacea Gimmerthal, 1842
Lucilia violacina Robineau-Desvoidy, 1863
Lucilia virgo Robineau-Desvoidy, 1830
Lucilia viridana Robineau-Desvoidy, 1863
Lucilia viridescens Robineau-Desvoidy, 1830
Lucilia viridifrons Macquart, 1843
Lucilia viridis Robineau-Desvoidy, 1863

References

Calliphoridae
Oestroidea genera
Taxa named by Jean-Baptiste Robineau-Desvoidy